Rosalia Lombardo (13 December 1918 – 6 December 1920) was a Palermitan child who died of pneumonia, resulting from the Spanish flu, one week before her second birthday. Rosalia's father, Mario Lombardo, was grieving her death, asked Alfredo Salafia, an embalmer, to preserve her remains. Sometimes called "Sleeping Beauty", hers was one of the last corpses to be admitted to the Capuchin catacombs of Palermo in Sicily.

Embalming

Thanks to Salafia's embalming techniques, the body was well-preserved. X-rays of the body show that all the organs are remarkably intact. Rosalia Lombardo's body is kept in a small chapel at the end of the catacomb's tour and is encased in a glass covered coffin, placed on a wooden pedestal.  A 2009 National Geographic photograph of Rosalia Lombardo shows the mummy is beginning to show signs of decomposition, most notably discoloration. Her body is starting to take on a yellow waxy skin texture. To address these issues, the mummy was moved to a drier spot in the catacombs, and her original coffin was placed in a hermetically sealed glass enclosure with   nitrogen gas to prevent decay. The mummy remains one of the best preserved bodies in the catacombs.

That same year, Capuchin catacombs curator Dario Piombino-Mascali discovered a handwritten manuscript written by Salafia, wherein he lists the ingredients used to mummify Rosalia. The embalming formula is described as "one part glycerin, one part formalin saturated with zinc sulfate and zinc chloride, and one part of an alcohol solution saturated with salicylic acid", and was entered into the body through a single-point injection, most likely into the femoral artery via a gravity injector. Rossella Lorenzi of Discovery News reported that the formalin was used to kill bacteria, the glycerin used to prevent desiccation, and the salicylic acid used to eliminate any fungi within the flesh, with the purpose of the zinc salts being petrifaction.

The mummy has achieved further notoriety for a phenomenon in which her eyes appear to open and close several times a day, revealing her intact blue irises. In response to speculation about her moving eyelids, Piombino-Mascali stated that "It's an optical illusion produced by the light that filters through the side windows, which during the day is subject to change ... [her eyes] are not completely closed, and indeed they have never been".

References

Sources
Dario Piombino-Mascali, 2020. Lo spazio di un mattino. Storia di Rosalia Lombardo, la bambina che dorme da cento anni. Dario Flaccovio, Palermo.

External links

 Recent photograph

1918 births
1920 deaths
20th-century Italian people
Italian children
Deaths from pneumonia in Sicily
Deaths from Spanish flu
Mummies
Child deaths